This List of canal basins in the United Kingdom is a list of articles about any canal basin in the United Kingdom.

Birmingham Canal Navigations
Caggy's Boatyard, Tipton,  on the BCN New Main Line
Gas Street Basin, Birmingham, at the junction of the Worcester and Birmingham Canal and the BCN Main Line
Tividale Quays Basin, Tipton, on the BCN Old Main Line

Grand Junction Canal
Paddington Basin

Peak Forest Canal
Bugsworth Basin

Regent's Canal
Battlebridge Basin
City Road Basin
Cumberland Basin (London) filled in
Kingsland Basin
Limehouse Basin
St Pancras Basin
Wenlock Basin

Sheffield and South Yorkshire Navigation
Victoria Quays

Stourbridge Canal
Stourbridge Basin

See also

Canals of Great Britain
List of canal aqueducts in the United Kingdom
List of canal junctions in the United Kingdom
List of canal locks in the United Kingdom
List of canal tunnels in the United Kingdom
Shadwell Basin and Hermitage Basin, both part of the London Docks
Mersey Basin Campaign

 
Canal basins
Canal